Heelys, Inc., formerly known as Heeling Sports Limited, is the company which currently owns the Heelys, Soap, and Axis (unofficially defunct) brands.  Heelys' headquarters is, and for and its entire history has been, located in Carrollton, Texas.

Heeling Sports Limited started in 2000 as the parent company to the brand responsible for its existence - Heelys shoes. The concept of shoes with a wheel in the sole was pushed forward by the company's founder and the creator of the Heely, Roger Adams.

Heavy marketing for the Heely was always focused on advancing the shoes outreach. Heelys once rapidly gained popularity. However, from 2009 onward, Heelys have lost much of their popularity from declining sales, inventory issues and safety concerns (especially among children).

Even before the invention of the shoe with a wheel in the heel, Mr. Adams had been in contact with the creator of Soap shoes, Chris Morris. Mr. Adams presented to him the idea of a hybrid shoe: a Heelys shoe which utilizes Soap's patented grindplate. Morris ultimately turned down the idea, and the two innovators went their separate ways, pursuing what they had started.

On August 31, 2021, Heelys' parent company, Sequential Brands, filed for Chapter 11 bankruptcy protection.

Acquisition 

On September 25, 2002, the agreement to purchase Soap and all of its assets from the recently bankrupted company In-Stride was signed by Heelys CEO, Mike Staffaroni. Plans for a large line of new models were immediately set, and were released in 2003.

Many of Heelys' signature colorways and styles can be seen incorporated into the newest Soap shoes. A number of changes were also made. The center of complaint replying to Heelys' new styling was the lack of variety; nearly all of the shoes had the same lower half, and even their upper sections were somewhat similar, more or less from model to model. In some cases, the designs were direct recycles from older Heelys shoes, except sporting a different grindplate and trademark. Heelys stock had sunk down to $2.25 per share and was sold to Sequential Brand Group for $63.2 million, taking the soap and other grind shoe patents with it.

References

External links 

 Heelys Official Homepage
 Heelys Official Website UK and Europe

Shoe companies of the United States
Sporting goods manufacturers of the United States
Companies based in Carrollton, Texas
Clothing companies established in 2000
2000s fashion
2010s fashion
American brands
Companies that filed for Chapter 11 bankruptcy in 2021